The Assistant Secretary of Defense for Health Affairs (ASD(HA)) is chartered under United States Department of Defense Directive (DoDD) 5136.1  in 1994. This DoDD states that the ASD(HA) is the principal advisor to the U.S. Secretary of Defense on all "DoD health policies, programs and activities." In addition to exercising oversight of all DoD health resources, ASD(HA) serves as director of the Tricare Management Activity.

The ASD(HA) reports to the Undersecretary of Defense (Personnel and Readiness), or USD(P&R). A political appointee responsible for the United States Department of Defense's Military Health System , the ASD(HA) is an Executive Service Level IV official. He or she is nominated by the president of the United States, and confirmed by the United States Senate.

History

This position was originally established in 1949 as the Chairman, Armed Forces Medical Policy Council. Reorganization Plan No. 6 (1953) abolished the council and transferred its functions to a new position, the Assistant Secretary of Defense (Health Affairs). In August 1953, some functions of this position were transferred to the Assistant Secretary of Defense (Manpower), and the title was changed to Assistant Secretary of Defense (Health and Medical).

The position was abolished completely on January 31, 1961, and for the remainder of the decade, all of its functions were vested in the Assistant Secretary of Defense (Manpower). However, Congress authorized a permanent assistant secretary position for health affairs in November 1969 (P.L. 91-121). The post was then re-established as Assistant Secretary of Defense (Health and Environment) in June 1970 by Defense Directive 5136.1. In January 1976, the position  was re-designated Assistant Secretary of Defense (Health Affairs), a title that has endured to the present day.

Responsibilities

The ASD(HA) is responsible for a number of organizations which directly affect the health care of service members and their dependents. These responsibilities are executed through several Senior Executive Service managers, including the Principal Deputy Assistant Secretary of Defense (Health Affairs) and the following Deputy Assistant Secretaries:
Force Health Protection & Readiness (FHP&R)
Clinical and Program Policy
Health Budgets and Financial Policy.

Other special activities within Health Affairs' jurisdiction include the TRICARE Management Activity, an extensive network of private physicians and hospitals providing health maintenance to service members. With a $40 billion budget (as of 2005), the Military Health System (MHS) provides care for roughly 9.2 million (as of 2005) people through TRICARE and through more than 70 military hospitals worldwide. MHS comprises over 133,000 military and civilian doctors, nurses, medical educators, researchers, health care providers, allied health professionals, and health administration personnel worldwide, providing our nation with an unequalled integrated healthcare delivery, expeditionary medical, educational, and research capability.

The ASD (HA) oversees the Uniformed Services University of Health Sciences (USUHS), which educates uniform physicians and other health professionals for the Army, Navy, Air Force and Public Health Service. The ASD(HA) also directly tasks the International Health Division of FHP&R, while FHP&R provides administrative oversight and resources.

Current and Past Assistant Secretaries

The table below includes both the various titles of this post over time, as well as all the holders of those offices.

Persons marked with a * are interim officials described in military documents as "Performing the Duties of the ASD/HA," rather than as "Acting"

References 

Defense Centers of Excellence for Psychological Health and Traumatic Brain Injury
 
1949 establishments in the United States